Here to Stay is the second album by the duo of composer Jan Hammer and guitarist Neal Schon. This album also featured contributions from Schon's bandmates in Journey including songwriting and background vocals from Steve Perry, notable as the only time Schon and Perry collaborated outside of Journey.

The lead single "No More Lies" featured Schon on vocals and had a music video that was played on MTV.

The album cover is a play on the well known Arm & Hammer brand baking soda.

"Self Defense" would later be re-recorded for Journey's 2005 album Generations (under the title "In Self Defense"), with Schon taking lead vocal duties once again.

Track listing 
Side one
"No More Lies"  – 3:29
"Don't Stay Away"  – 3:35
"(You Think You're) So Hot"  – 3:54
"Turnaround"  – 4:48
"Self Defense"  – 3:13

Side two
"Long Time"  – 3:50
"Time Again"  – 4:55
"Sticks and Stones"  – 3:15
"Peace of Mind"  – 2:10 (instrumental)
"Covered by Midnight"  – 5:27

Bonus track on 2013 reissue
"Weekend Heaven" – 3:45

Personnel

Musicians
Jan Hammer – drums, keyboards, percussion
Neal Schon – guitars, synthesizer, vocals
Glen Burtnik – vocals
Colin Hodgkinson – bass guitar
Steve Smith – drums on track 5
Ross Valory – bass guitar on track 5
Steve Perry – vocals on track 5

Production
Arranged and produced by Neal Schon and Jan Hammer
Track 5 produced by Mike "Clay" Stone and Kevin Elson
Recorded by Jan Hammer
Mixed by Jan Hammer and Kevin Elson (at Fantasy Studios, Berkeley)
Bob Ludwig – mastering at Masterdisk, New York

References 

1982 albums
Schon & Hammer albums
Columbia Records albums